Odis Jackson Allison Jr. (born October 2, 1949) is a retired American basketball player.

Born in Tulare, California, Allison played collegiately for the University of Nevada, Las Vegas.  He was selected by the Golden State Warriors in the 5th round (76th pick overall) of the 1971 NBA Draft.  He played for the Warriors in the NBA (1971–72) for 36 games.

References

1949 births
Living people
American men's basketball players
Basketball players from Oakland, California
Golden State Warriors draft picks
Golden State Warriors players
Small forwards
UNLV Runnin' Rebels basketball players